The following lists events that happened during 1846 in Chile.

Incumbents
President of Chile: Manuel Bulnes

Events 
18 September – Chilean presidential election, 1846

Births
24 March – Juan José Latorre, Vice Admiral (d. 1912)
date unknown – Pedro Montt, president of Chile (d. 1910)

Deaths
date unknown – Mariano Egaña, lawyer and politician (b. 1793)

References 

 
1840s in Chile
Chile
Chile